The Master Strikes (Also known as Fist of Tiger or Crazy Tiger Fist) is 1980 Hong Kong comedy martial arts movie set in 1920s and 1930s China. the film was directed by Kao Pao-shu and starring Casanova Wong, Meng Yuen-Man and Ching Siu-Tung.

Plot

The film is set in the Qing period before Sun Yat-sen's revolt. Chen, a bodyguard, is entrusted by Lung Tung Chien to protect a rare treasure. After having a hard time to protecting the treasure (sleeping on the top to make sure the treasure is safe), he finds out it has been stolen. As a result, he becomes violently insane. The two con men Lung and Li find out about Chen and the treasure's connection, and they decide to help Chen to find the treasure in an attempt to get rich.

Cast

Casanova Wong as Chen
Meng Yuen-Man as Li
Ching Siu-Tung as Lung (action director)
Yen Shi Kwan as Lung Tung Chien
Meg Lam Kin-Ming 
Max Lee Chiu Jun as Beggar Su
Chap Lap-Ban as old prostitute 
Hon Kwok Choi as waiter at the restaurant (cameo, uncredited)
Wong Mei Mei
Tony Leung Siu Hung as thug (assistant action director)
Eddy Co Hung
Fong Ping as prostitute 
Mama Hung as prostitute
Yuen Bo
Lee Fat Yuen as thug (extra, uncredited)

Reception

Carl Davis of DVD Talk rated it 2.5/5 stars and compared it negatively to the contemporaneous films of Jackie Chan and Sammo Hung.  J. Doyle Wallis, also writing for DVD Talk, rated it 2.5/5 stars and called it "a bit of low budget, martial comedy silliness."

References

External links

1980 films
Hong Kong action films
1980 martial arts films
Hong Kong martial arts films
1980s Hong Kong films